Giacomo Delcroix (28 November 1894 – 1972) was an Italian landscape and still life painter.

Biography
Giacomo Delcroix was born in Florence on 28 November 1894 of Giuseppe Delcroix, contractor of Belgian origin, and Ida Corbi daughter of artisans. After living and having completed his first studies in Livorno, he returns to Florence with his parents and brother  , who will become a well-known military, politician, skilled orator, writer and President of the National Association for the disabled of war and Maggio Musicale Fiorentino. Among his masters we remember the painter Giacomo Lolli (1857 - 1915) and the painter and decorator Luigi Cavalieri (1869 - 1940), both from Bologna, and the ceramist Carlo Guerrini (1880-1930). Gifted with great technique, he was also an excellent restorer. He died in Florence in 1972 and was buried in monumental Cimitero delle Porte Sante near San Miniato al Monte.

Artwork
He was an appreciated landscape painter, endowed with an extraordinary pictorial technique and a particularly light and delicate touch; he achieves in his paintings, almost always linked to the Tuscan landscape, a  naturalistic and vivid representation of reality of great breadth and spatiality with an important sensitivity for the diffusion of light and for atmospheric elements. In the 1930s and 1940s he preferred painting on panels, titling his works on the reverse, without dating them  except in rare cases, while in the 1950s and 1960s he started to painting on canvas. His works, of great classical impact, are present in many private collections and galleries of Modern Art in Italy and abroad. We can remember the paintings “Hills around Florence” at the Galleria d'Arte Moderna in Milan and “Going towards Verna”  at the Gallery of modern art in Villa Saluzzo Serra in Genoa.

Works
 “Fishermen”, dated 1921, Oil on card.
 “Winter”, dated 1931, Oil on panel.
 “Vase with flowers”, dated 1932, Oil on panel.
 "Still life with lemons and cherries", Oil on panel.
 “View of Settignano”, Oil on panel.
 “Florentine hills”, Oil on panel.
 “Surroundings of Florence”, Oil on canvas.
 "Near " Oil on canvas.
 “Italian Landscape”, Oil on canvas.
 "View of Florence", Oil on canvas.
 “Road that leads to  Fiesole”, Oil on canvas.
 “Along the  Mugnone river”, Oil on panel.
 “Duomo of Florence from a hill”, Oil on panel.
 “Marina”, Oil on panel. 
 “Farmhouses in Mugello”, Oil on board. 
 “Surroundings of Pistoia”, Oil on board.
 "Paesaggio con torrente e case", Oil on board.

References

1894 births
1972 deaths
Italian LGBT painters
19th-century Italian painters
Italian male painters
20th-century Italian painters
Painters from Florence
Italian landscape painters
20th-century Italian LGBT people
19th-century Italian male artists
20th-century Italian male artists